Maria Ivanovna Babanova (11 November 1900 – 20 March 1983) was a Soviet and Russian actress and pedagogue. She has been described as Vsevolod Meyerhold's greatest actress and was named a People's Artist of the USSR in 1954.

Life and career 
Babanova made her debut in Theodore Komisarjevsky's theatre in 1919. A year later, she joined Vsevolod Meyerhold's acting courses. Described as "a small, radiant, energetic actor", Babanova captivated the Moscow public in Meyerhold's production of The Magnanimous Cuckold (1922). 

The three leading players, Igor Ilyinsky, Maria Babanova and Vasily Zaichikov were so in harmony they became known collectively as 'Il-Ba-Zai'. Babanova was viewed as the first great actress to emerge after the October Revolution. A typical review of her acting read as follows:

Babanova's triumphs allegedly aroused the jealousy of Meyerhold's wife, Zinaida Reich. In 1927, Babanova was forced to leave Meyerhold's troupe, as major female roles went to Reich and she felt underemployed. Babanova excelled at the Mayakovsky Theatre in the roles of children and adolescents. She retired from acting in 1979 and died in 1983, aged 82.

The Snow Queen 
The eponymous character from the film of the same name was voiced by her. The animators took a new approach to drawing the Snow Queen. They emphasized the spectral presence of the Snow Queen by using the animation technique known as rotoscoping or "éclair" named after the table manufactured by the company of the same name. Éclair method used a epidiascope that would be fixed on one side of a furniture equipment provided by furniture company Éclair and the screen projector was fixed on the other side. As one of the acclaimed actresses of Soviet Union, Maria Babanova and some of the other cast members were filmed as if the actors are in a live performance with makeup and costume. Then the film footage was transferred to celluloid with some corrections. The role of the Snow Queen would resemble the mannerisms and unique qualities of the actress as the film footage was translated into frame-by-frame drawings. Maria Babanova's voice was fitting for the character.

Selected filmography

 Alone (1931) as Chairman's wife
Alisher Navoi (1947) as Gyuli's voice (played by Tamara Nazarova)
The Tale of the Fisherman and the Fish (1950) as the Golden Fish (voice)
The Tale of the Dead Princess and the Seven Knights (1951) as Tsarina/Magic Mirror (voice, uncredited)
The Scarlet Flower (1952) as Lyubava (voice, uncredited)
In a Faraway Kingdom... (1957) as the Pike (voice)
The Snow Queen (1957) as The Snow Queen (voice and motion capture)

References

External links
 

1900 births
1983 deaths
20th-century Russian actresses
Actresses from Moscow
Honored Artists of the RSFSR
People's Artists of the RSFSR
People's Artists of the USSR
Stalin Prize winners
Recipients of the Order of Lenin
Recipients of the Order of the Red Banner of Labour
Russian drama teachers
Russian film actresses
Russian silent film actresses
Russian stage actresses
Russian voice actresses
Soviet drama teachers
Soviet film actresses
Soviet silent film actresses
Soviet stage actresses
Soviet voice actresses
Burials at Novodevichy Cemetery